Food Uncut is a programme on UKTV Food (formerly UKTV Bright Ideas before it was renamed to Dave). It was presented by Merrilees Parker, Stefan Gates and Jean-Christophe Novelli, with Olly Smith as a guest presenter and resident food and wine expert.

References

British cooking television shows
2010s British cooking television series
English-language television shows